Sovremennaya Rech (The Modern Word) was a liberal bourgeois daily newspaper published in St. Petersburg, Russia, from January to May 1907. Politically, the publication supported the Cadets.

References

Newspapers published in the Russian Empire
Mass media in Saint Petersburg